Sjoerd Wiemer Sjoerdsma  (born 10 July 1981) is a Dutch politician of the D66 party serving as a member of the House of Representatives since 20 September 2012, after having been elected in the 2012 Dutch general election.

Early career
Prior to being elected he worked for the Ministry of Foreign Affairs. During his period as a diplomat he was posted to the Dutch Embassies in Belgium and Afghanistan and to the Permanent Representation to the Palestinian Authority.

Member of Parliament
In parliament, Sjoerdsma serves as his party’s foreign affairs. In addition to his committee assignments, he is a member of the Dutch delegation to the NATO Parliamentary Assembly.

Political positions
In 2019, Sjoerdsma publicly criticized Queen Máxima of the Netherlands over a meeting she held with Saudi Crown Prince Mohammed bin Salman on the sidelines of the 2019 G20 Osaka summit without raising the murder of journalist Jamal Khashoggi.

Sjoerdsma is an outspoken critic of China's human rights abuses in Xinjiang. In March 2021, the Chinese government banned Sjoerdsma from entering mainland China and conducting business with Chinese firms in retaliation for European Union-imposed sanctions against four Chinese officials for their roles in perpetrating the Uyghur genocide.

Electoral history

References

External links 
  Parlement.com biography
  Sj.W. (Sjoerd Wiemer) Sjoerdsma MSc (Montesquieu Institute)

1981 births
Living people
Alumni of the London School of Economics
Democrats 66 politicians
21st-century Dutch diplomats
Members of the House of Representatives (Netherlands)
People from Eindhoven
Utrecht University alumni
21st-century Dutch politicians
20th-century Dutch people